The University of Kotli Azad Jammu and Kashmir is a university in the Pakistani Administered self governing region of Azad Jammu and Kashmir. The University of Kotli (کوٹلی یونیورسٹی) (UoK) was formerly a constituent college of the University of Azad Jammu and Kashmir. It was formerly known as the University College of Administrative Sciences Kotli (UCK) and as the  Faculty of Administrative Sciences Kotli (FASK). UoK is state university and the President of Azad Jammu & Kashmir State serves as the Chancellor of the University. The Vice-Chancellor is the chief executive and manages the university.

For the past three decades, the University's School of Administrative Sciences Kotli has had over 3,000 graduates in the field of Business Management, Public Administration, Commerce, Computer Science and Information.

History 
UoK became a University as a result of Presidential Ordinance VIII of 2014. The change in the status of the school was made in order to offer higher education and research in the Country of Azad Jammu and Kashmir and their surrounding area.

Organization 

UoK is state university and the President of Azad Jammu & Kashmir State serves as the Chancellor of the University. The Vice-Chancellor is the chief executive and manages the university.

Degree Programs

The University offers a broad range of bachelor, master and doctoral degree programs in 150+ disciplines such as architecture Commerce, Accounting, Business Administration, Banking and Finance, Business and IT, Computer Science, Economics, Education, Electrical Engineering, Aviation, Management, Supply Chain, Textile Engineering, Industrial Engineering, Information Systems, Linguistics, Media and Communication, Agri-business, School Management, Social Sciences, Educational Leadership Management, Law, English Language Teaching, and many more and these are the details :

Bachelors programs 
 Business Administration
 Bachelor of Architecture and Town Planning 
 Banking and Finance
 Commerce
 Management
 Mathematics
 Economics
 English
 Computer Sciences
 Information technology
 Software Engineering
 Biotechnology
 Botany
 Chemistry
 Physics
 Zoology

Master degree programs 
 MBA (3.5 years) after 2-year traditional bachelors
 MBA Executive (2-year)
 MBA (1.5 years) after 4-year bachelors or Masters
 BBS (2 year)
 M.Com (2 years) 
 MPA (2 years)
 M.Sc HRM
 M.Sc Banking and Finance 
 M.Sc Enterprise Management and Development studies
 M.Sc Mathematics
 M.Sc Economics
 M.Sc Sociology
 M.Sc Statistics
 M.Sc Zoology
 M.A English
 M.Ed.
 LLB (3 years)

Ph.D./M.Phil./MS programs 
 Ph.D. Economics
 Ph.D. Management Sciences
 M.Phil./MS Economics
 M.Phil./MS Management Sciences
 M.Phil./MS Computer Sciences

Departments

The university has the following departments.

Faculty of Administrative Sciences
 Department of Business Administration 
 Department of Software Engineering 
 Department of Computer Science and Information technology
 Department of Public Administration
 Department of English
 Department of Law
 Department of Mathematics

Faculty of commerce
 Department of Commerce
 Department of Economics
 Faculty of Sciences

Facilities

Library and laboratories
The University has a well-equipped library and computer laboratories.

Scholarships
The university provides merit-based and need-based scholarships. Most of these are funded by private foundations and non-governmental organizations.

References

External links

University of Kotli
2014 establishments in Pakistan